Linas Balčiūnas (born 14 February 1978 in Jonava) is a Lithuanian former road and track cyclist, who represented Lithuania at 1996 and 2004 Summer Olympics.

During the 2004 UCI Track Cycling World Cup Classics, he won a gold medal at the Moscow Cup with the national pursuit team. Balčiūnas participated at 2005 UCI Road World Championships, where he achieved 43rd place in the time trial.

Major results

1997
 3rd Road race, National Road Championships
1998
 1st Stage 3 Tour of Rhodes
 3rd Tour Beneden-Maas
1999
 1st Chrono Champenois
 3rd Tour de la Somme
2000
 1st Stage 1b Tour de l'Ain
 2nd Henk Vos Memorial
 2nd Omloop van het Houtland
 3rd Time trial, National Road Championships
 6th Overall Tour de Normandie
 7th Overall Tour du Limousin
2001
 2nd Time trial, National Road Championships
 3rd Overall Tour de Picardie
1st Stage 3a
2005
 3rd Overall Tour of Belgium
 3rd Overall Tour du Poitou Charentes
1st Stage 4a
 7th GP de Fourmies
 7th Châteauroux Classic
 8th Tro-Bro Léon
2008
 1st Stage 4 Dookoła Mazowsza

References 

1978 births
Living people
Lithuanian male cyclists
Cyclists at the 1996 Summer Olympics
Cyclists at the 2004 Summer Olympics
Olympic cyclists of Lithuania
Sportspeople from Jonava